John Mitchels GAA may refer to:

 John Mitchels GAA (Kerry), a sports club in Tralee, Ireland
 John Mitchels GAA (Waterford), a sports club in Kilmacthomas, Ireland

See also
 Castlebar Mitchels GAA, a sports club in County Mayo, Ireland
 John Mitchel GFC, a sports club in Newry, County Down
 John Mitchel's Hurling Club, a sports club in Birmingham, England
 John Mitchel's GAC Claudy, a sports club in Claudy
 John Mitchel's GAC Glenullin, a sports club in Glenullin
 Magheracloone Mitchell's GAC, a sports club in County Monaghan, Ireland